Roscoe Pietersen (born 27 January 1989) is a South African soccer player who plays as a defender for Chippa United in the Premier Soccer League. He has been capped once for South Africa.

References

External links

1989 births
Living people
Sportspeople from Cape Town
Cape Coloureds
South African soccer players
South African Premier Division players
Association football defenders
SuperSport United F.C. players
AmaZulu F.C. players
Vasco da Gama (South Africa) players
Cape Town Spurs F.C. players
Cape Umoya United F.C. players
Chippa United F.C. players
South Africa international soccer players